Braspetro was a Brazilian state company. It was founded in 1972 as a subsidiary of Petrobras to find and produce oil outside Brazil. (As Petrobras had a monopoly over Brazilian oil production at the time, it was forbidden by law to operate internationally.) Its biggest discovery was Majnoon Field in Iraq.

Braspetro was incorporated by Petrobras and replaced by its international board, although it still formally exists as PIB BV - Petrobras International Braspetro B.V., a Dutch holding company that controls Petrobras's participation in foreign countries and is 100% owned by Petrobras.

External links

 Braspetro record
 Lasmo

Petrobras
Oil and gas companies of Brazil
Transport companies established in 1972
Non-renewable resource companies established in 1972
Brazilian companies established in 1972